Burk's Falls is an incorporated village in the Almaguin Highlands region of Parry Sound District, Ontario, Canada, located  north of Toronto and  south of North Bay, Ontario. The village, and the waterfall on the site, were named (for himself) by David Francis Burk of Oshawa, after he selected the land surrounding the waterfall in the Free Land Grant Act. Burk's Falls is part of the Magnetawan River waterway.

Geography
It is an enclave within Armour Township. The area is set amid the fresh-water bodies that make Northern Ontario famous; the largest of which are Horn Lake to the Northwest, Pickerel Lake to the Northeast, Three Mile Lake to the Southeast, and the joined Doe and Little Doe Lakes to the Southwest.

History

The area around Burk's Falls was first settled by loggers during the 1860s. At that time, the only access to the region was via the Magnetawan River from Georgian Bay, or through the forests of the unsurveyed townships, north of Bracebridge. After 1875 the Rosseau-Nipissing Colonization Road allowed access from Muskoka, to the south. In 1879 steamboat service was established to the foot of the falls, from the historic village of Magnetawan. Railway service came to Burk's Falls in 1886, with the opening of Northern and Pacific Junction Railway, absorbed by the Grand Trunk Railway in 1888. The Village of Burk's Falls was incorporated in 1890.

A rare swing bridge was completed over the Magnetawan, just west of Burk's Falls.

Growth of the village
This growth has been limited and Burk's Falls has not amalgamated with any nearby towns such as Katrine. The population has remained steady over the last decades, standing around 1000. Expansion of Highway 11 as a dual carriageway has prompted a new interchange.

Also located in Burk's Falls is the Outward Bound Canadian Base Camp.

Demographics

Transportation
The village is served by provincial highways 11 and 520.

Intercity motor coach service to Burk's Falls is provided by Ontario Northland along its Toronto–Barrie–Parry Sound–Sudbury route's local schedule; it is bypassed by express schedules, but still receives twice-daily service northbound and southbound.

References

External links

Municipalities in Parry Sound District
Single-tier municipalities in Ontario
Villages in Ontario
Magnetawan River